The  (abbreviated as PS, commonly known as the PS1/PS one or its codename PSX) is a home video game console developed and marketed by Sony Computer Entertainment. It was released in Japan on 3 December 1994, in North America on 9 September 1995, in Europe on 29 September 1995, and in Australia on 15 November 1995. As a fifth-generation console, the PlayStation primarily competed with the Nintendo 64 and the Sega Saturn.

Sony began developing the PlayStation after a failed venture with Nintendo to create a CD-ROM peripheral for the Super Nintendo Entertainment System in the early 1990s. The console was primarily designed by Ken Kutaragi and Sony Computer Entertainment in Japan, while additional development was outsourced in the United Kingdom. An emphasis on 3D polygon graphics was placed at the forefront of the console's design. PlayStation game production was designed to be streamlined and inclusive, enticing the support of many third-party developers.

The console proved popular for its extensive game library, popular franchises, low retail price, and aggressive youth marketing which advertised it as the preferable console for adolescents and adults. Premier PlayStation franchises included Gran Turismo, Crash Bandicoot, Spyro, Tomb Raider, Metal Gear, Tekken, and Final Fantasy, all of which spawned numerous sequels. PlayStation games continued to sell until Sony ceased production of the PlayStation and its games on 23 March 2006—over eleven years after it had been released, and less than a year before the debut of the PlayStation 3. A total of 3,061 PlayStation games were released, with cumulative sales of 967 million units.

The PlayStation signalled Sony's rise to power in the video game industry. It received acclaim and sold strongly; in less than a decade, it became the first computer entertainment platform to ship over 100 million units. Its use of compact discs heralded the game industry's transition from cartridges. The PlayStation's success led to a line of successors, beginning with the PlayStation 2 in 2000. In the same year, Sony released a smaller and cheaper model, the PS One.

History

Background

The PlayStation was conceived by Ken Kutaragi, a Sony executive who managed a hardware engineering division and was later dubbed "the Father of the PlayStation". Kutaragi's interest in working with video games stemmed from seeing his daughter play games on Nintendo's Famicom. Kutaragi convinced Nintendo to use his SPC-700 sound processor in the Super Nintendo Entertainment System (SNES) through a demonstration of the processor's capabilities. His willingness to work with Nintendo derived from both his admiration of the Famicom and conviction in video game consoles becoming the main home-use entertainment systems. Although Kutaragi was nearly fired because he worked with Nintendo without Sony's knowledge, president Norio Ohga recognised the potential in Kutaragi's chip and decided to keep him as a protégé.

The inception of the PlayStation dates back to a 1988 joint venture between Nintendo and Sony. Nintendo had produced floppy disk technology to complement cartridges in the form of the Family Computer Disk System, and wanted to continue this complementary storage strategy for the SNES. Since Sony was already contracted to produce the SPC-700 sound processor for the SNES, Nintendo contracted Sony to develop a CD-ROM add-on, tentatively titled the "Play Station" or "SNES-CD".

Sony was keen to obtain a foothold in the rapidly expanding video game market. Having been the primary manufacturer of the ill-fated MSX home computer format, Sony had wanted to use their experience in consumer electronics to produce their own video game hardware. Although the initial agreement between Nintendo and Sony was about producing a CD-ROM add-on, Sony had also planned to develop a SNES-compatible Sony-branded console. This iteration was intended to be more of a home entertainment system, playing both SNES cartridges and a new CD format named the "Super Disc", which Sony would design. Under the agreement, Sony would retain sole international rights to every Super Disc game, giving them a large degree of control despite Nintendo's leading position in the video game market. Furthermore, Sony would also be the sole benefactor of licensing related to music and film software that it had been aggressively pursuing as a secondary application.

The Play Station was to be announced at the 1991 Consumer Electronics Show (CES) in Las Vegas. However, Nintendo president Hiroshi Yamauchi was wary of Sony's increasing leverage at this point and deemed the original 1988 contract unacceptable upon realising it essentially handed Sony control over all games written on the SNES CD-ROM format. Although Nintendo was dominant in the video game market, Sony possessed a superior research and development department. Wanting to protect Nintendo's existing licensing structure, Yamauchi cancelled all plans for the joint Nintendo–Sony SNES CD attachment without telling Sony. He sent Nintendo of America president Minoru Arakawa (his son-in-law) and chairman Howard Lincoln to Amsterdam to form a more favourable contract with Dutch conglomerate Philips, Sony's rival. This contract would give Nintendo total control over their licences on all Philips-produced machines.

Kutaragi and Nobuyuki Idei, Sony's director of public relations at the time, learned of Nintendo's actions two days before the CES was due to begin. Kutaragi telephoned numerous contacts, including Philips, to no avail. On the first day of the CES, Sony announced their partnership with Nintendo and their new console, the Play Station. At 9 am on the next day, in what has been called "the greatest ever betrayal" in the industry, Howard Lincoln stepped onto the stage and revealed that Nintendo was now allied with Philips and would abandon their work with Sony.

Inception

Incensed by Nintendo's renouncement, Ohga and Kutaragi decided that Sony would develop their own console. Nintendo's contract-breaking was met with consternation in the Japanese business community, as they had broken an "unwritten law" of native companies not turning against each other in favour of foreign ones. Sony's American branch considered allying with Sega to produce a CD-ROM-based machine called the Sega Multimedia Entertainment System, but their board of directors in Tokyo vetoed the idea when American CEO Tom Kalinske presented them the proposal. Kalinske recalled them saying: "That's a stupid idea, Sony doesn't know how to make hardware. They don't know how to make software either. Why would we want to do this?" Sony halted their research, but decided to develop what it had developed with Nintendo and Sega into a console based on the SNES.

Despite the tumultuous events at the 1991 CES, negotiations between Nintendo and Sony were still ongoing. A deal was proposed: the Play Station would still have a port for SNES games, on the condition that it would still use Kutaragi's audio chip and that Nintendo would own the rights and receive the bulk of the profits. Roughly two hundred prototype machines were created, and some software entered development. Many within Sony were still opposed to their involvement in the video game industry, with some resenting Kutaragi for jeopardising the company. Kutaragi remained adamant that Sony not retreat from the growing industry and that a deal with Nintendo would never work. Knowing that it had to take decisive action, Sony severed all ties with Nintendo on 4 May 1992.

To determine the fate of the PlayStation project, Ohga chaired a meeting in June 1992, consisting of Kutaragi and several senior Sony board members. Kutaragi unveiled a proprietary CD-ROM-based system he had been secretly working on which played games with immersive 3D graphics. Kutaragi was confident that his LSI chip could accommodate one million logic gates, which exceeded the capabilities of Sony's semiconductor division at the time. Despite gaining Ohga's enthusiasm, there remained opposition from a majority present at the meeting. Older Sony executives also opposed it, who saw Nintendo and Sega as "toy" manufacturers. The opposers felt the game industry was too culturally offbeat and asserted that Sony should remain a central player in the audiovisual industry, where companies were familiar with one another and could conduct "civili[s]ed" business negotiations. After Kutaragi reminded him of the humiliation he suffered from Nintendo, Ohga retained the project and became one of Kutaragi's most staunch supporters.

Ohga shifted Kutaragi and nine of his team from Sony's main headquarters to Sony Music Entertainment Japan (SMEJ), a subsidiary of the main Sony group, so as to retain the project and maintain relationships with Philips for the MMCD development project. The involvement of SMEJ proved crucial to the PlayStation's early development as the process of manufacturing games on CD-ROM format was similar to that used for audio CDs, with which Sony's music division had considerable experience. While at SMEJ, Kutaragi worked with Epic/Sony Records founder Shigeo Maruyama and Akira Sato; both later became vice presidents of the division that ran the PlayStation business. Sony Computer Entertainment (SCE) was jointly established by Sony and SMEJ to handle the company's ventures into the video game industry. On 27 October 1993, Sony publicly announced that it was entering the game console market with the PlayStation. According to Maruyama, there was uncertainty over whether the console should primarily focus on 2D, sprite-based graphics or 3D polygon graphics. After Sony witnessed the success of Sega's Virtua Fighter (1993) in Japanese arcades, the direction of the PlayStation became "instantly clear" and 3D polygon graphics became the console's primary focus. SCE president Teruhisa Tokunaka expressed gratitude for Sega's timely release of Virtua Fighter as it proved "just at the right time" that making games with 3D imagery was possible. Maruyama claimed that Sony further wanted to emphasize the new console's ability to utilize redbook audio from the CD-ROM format in its games alongside high quality visuals and gameplay.

Wishing to distance the project from the failed enterprise with Nintendo, Sony initially branded the PlayStation the "PlayStation X" (PSX). Sony formed their European division and North American division, known as Sony Computer Entertainment Europe (SCEE) and Sony Computer Entertainment America (SCEA), in January and May 1995. The divisions planned to market the new console under the alternative branding "PSX" following the negative feedback regarding "PlayStation" in focus group studies. Early advertising prior to the console's launch in North America referenced PSX, but the term was scrapped before launch. The console was not marketed with Sony's name in contrast to Nintendo's consoles. According to Phil Harrison, much of Sony's upper management feared that the Sony brand would be tarnished if associated with the console, which they considered a "toy".

Development
Since Sony had no experience in game development, it had to rely on the support of third-party game developers. This was in contrast to Sega and Nintendo, which had versatile and well-equipped in-house software divisions for their arcade games and could easily port successful games to their home consoles. Recent consoles like the Atari Jaguar and 3DO suffered low sales due to a lack of developer support, prompting Sony to redouble their efforts in gaining the endorsement of arcade-savvy developers. A team from Epic Sony visited more than a hundred companies throughout Japan in May 1993 in hopes of attracting game creators with the PlayStation's technological appeal. Through a series of negotiations, Sony acquired initial support from Namco, Konami, and Williams Entertainment, as well as 250 other development teams in Japan alone. Namco in particular was keen to participate in the PlayStation project as a third-party developer since Namco rivalled Sega in the arcade market. Attaining these companies secured influential games such as Ridge Racer (1993) and Mortal Kombat 3 (1995), Ridge Racer being one of the most popular arcade games at the time. Namco's research managing director Shegeichi Nakamura met with Kutaragi in 1993 to discuss the preliminary PlayStation specifications, with Namco subsequently basing the Namco System 11 arcade board on PlayStation hardware and developing Tekken to compete with Virtua Fighter. The System 11 launched in arcades several months before the PlayStation's release, with the arcade release of Tekken in September 1994.

Despite securing the support of various Japanese studios, Sony had no developers of their own by the time the PlayStation was in development. This changed in 1993 when Sony acquired the Liverpudlian company Psygnosis (later renamed SCE Liverpool) for  million, securing their first in-house development team. The acquisition meant that Sony could have more launch games ready for the PlayStation's release in Europe and North America. Ian Hetherington, Psygnosis' co-founder, was disappointed after receiving early builds of the PlayStation and recalled that the console "was not fit for purpose" until his team got involved with it. Hetherington frequently clashed with Sony executives over broader ideas; at one point it was suggested that a television with a built-in PlayStation be produced. In the months leading up to the PlayStation's launch, Psygnosis had around 500 full-time staff working on games and assisting with software development.

The purchase of Psygnosis marked another turning point for the PlayStation as it played a vital role in creating the console's development kits. While Sony had provided MIPS R4000-based Sony NEWS workstations for PlayStation development, Psygnosis employees disliked the thought of developing on these expensive workstations and asked Bristol-based SN Systems to create an alternative PC-based development system. Andy Beveridge and Martin Day, owners of SN Systems, had previously supplied development hardware for other consoles such as the Mega Drive, Atari ST, and the SNES. When Psygnosis arranged an audience for SN Systems with Sony's Japanese executives at the January 1994 CES in Las Vegas, Beveridge and Day presented their prototype of the condensed development kit, which could run on an ordinary personal computer with two extension boards. Impressed, Sony decided to abandon their plans for a workstation-based development system in favour of SN Systems', thus securing a cheaper and more efficient method for designing software. An order of over 600 systems followed, and SN Systems supplied Sony with additional software such as an assembler, linker, and a debugger. SN Systems produced development kits for future PlayStation systems, including the PlayStation 2 and was bought out by Sony in 2005.

Sony strived to make game production as streamlined and inclusive as possible, in contrast to the relatively isolated approach of Sega and Nintendo. Phil Harrison, the then-representative director of SCEE, believed that Sony's emphasis on developer assistance reduced most time-consuming aspects of development. As well as providing programming libraries, SCE headquarters in London, California and Tokyo housed technical support teams that could work closely with third-party developers if needed. Peter Molyneux, who owned Bullfrog Productions at the time, admired Sony's open-handed approach to software developers and lauded their decision to use PCs as a development platform, remarking that "[it was] like being released from jail in terms of the freedom you have". Another strategy that helped attract software developers was the PlayStation's use of the CD-ROM format instead of traditional cartridges. In contrast to other disc-reading consoles such as the 3DO, the PlayStation could quickly generate and synthesise data from the CD since it was an image-generation system, rather than a data-replay system.

The PlayStation's architecture and interconnectability with PCs was beneficial to many software developers. The use of the programming language C proved useful during the early stages of development as it safeguarded future compatibility of the machine should developers decide to make further hardware revisions. Sony used the free software GNU C compiler, also known as GCC, to guarantee short debugging times as it was already familiar to many programmers. Despite the inherent flexibility, some developers found themselves restricted due to the console's lack of RAM. While working on beta builds of the PlayStation, Molyneux observed that its MIPS processor was not "quite as bullish" compared to that of a fast PC and said that it took his team two weeks to port their PC code to the PlayStation development kits and another fortnight to achieve a four-fold speed increase. An engineer from Ocean Software, one of Europe's largest game developers at the time, thought that allocating RAM was a challenging aspect given the 3.5 megabyte restriction. Kutaragi said that while it would have been easy to double the amount of RAM for the PlayStation, the development team refrained from doing so to keep the retail cost down. Kutaragi saw the biggest challenge in developing the system to be balancing the conflicting goals of high performance, low cost, and being easy to program for, and felt he and his team were successful in this regard.

Launch
Sales in Japan began with a "stunning" success with long queues in shops. It sold 100,000 units on the first day and two million units within six months, although the Saturn outsold the PlayStation in the first few weeks due to the success of Virtua Fighter. By the end of 1994, 300,000 PlayStation units were sold in Japan compared to 500,000 Saturn units. After a while, a grey market emerged for PlayStations, which were shipped from Japan to North America and Europe, with some buyers of such consoles paying large amounts of money in the range of £700.

Before the release in North America, Sega and Sony presented their consoles at the first Electronic Entertainment Expo (E3) in Los Angeles on 11 May 1995. At their keynote presentation, Sega of America CEO Tom Kalinske revealed that its Saturn console would be released immediately to select retailers at a price of $399. Next came Sony's turn: Olaf Olafsson, the head of SCEA, summoned Steve Race, the head of development, to the conference stage, who said "$299" and left the audience with a round of applause. The attention to the Sony conference was further bolstered by the surprise appearance of Michael Jackson and the showcase of highly anticipated games, including Wipeout (1995), Ridge Racer and Tekken (1994). In addition, Sony announced that no games would be bundled with the console.

Although the Saturn had released early in the United States to gain an advantage over the PlayStation, the surprise launch upset many retailers who were not informed in time, harming sales. Some retailers such as KB Toys responded by dropping the Saturn entirely. The PlayStation went on sale in North America on 9 September 1995. It sold more units within two days than the Saturn had in five months, with almost all of the initial shipment of 100,000 units sold in advance and shops across the country running out of consoles and accessories. The well-received Ridge Racer contributed to the PlayStation's early success, with some critics considering it superior to Sega's arcade counterpart Daytona USA (1994). There were over 100,000 pre-orders placed and 17 games available on the market by the time of the PlayStation's American launch, in comparison to the Saturn's six launch games.

The PlayStation released in Europe on 29 September 1995 and in Australia on 15 November 1995. By November it had already outsold the Saturn by three to one in the United Kingdom, where Sony had allocated a £20 million marketing budget during the Christmas season compared to Sega's £4 million. Sony found early success in the United Kingdom by securing listings with independent shop owners as well as prominent High Street chains such as Comet and Argos. Within its first year, the PlayStation secured over 20% of the entire American video game market. From September to the end of 1995, sales in the United States amounted to 800,000 units, giving the PlayStation a commanding lead over the other fifth-generation consoles, though the SNES and Mega Drive from the fourth generation still outsold it. Sony reported that the attach rate of sold games and consoles was four to one. To meet increasing demand, Sony chartered jumbo jets and ramped up production in Europe and North America. By early 1996, the PlayStation had grossed $2 billion (equivalent to $ billion ) from worldwide hardware and software sales. By late 1996, sales in Europe totalled  units, including 700,000 in the UK. Approximately 400 PlayStation games were in development, compared to around 200 games being developed for the Saturn and 60 for the Nintendo 64.

Marketing success and later years
The PlayStation was backed by a successful marketing campaign, allowing Sony to gain an early foothold in Europe and North America. Initially, PlayStation demographics were skewed towards adults, but the audience broadened after the first price drop. While the Saturn was positioned towards 18- to 34-year-olds, the PlayStation was initially marketed exclusively towards teenagers. Executives from both Sony and Sega reasoned that because younger players typically looked up to older, more experienced players, advertising targeted at teens and adults would draw them in too. Additionally, Sony found that adults reacted best to advertising aimed at teenagers; Lee Clow surmised that people who started to grow into adulthood regressed and became "17 again" when they played video games. The console was marketed with advertising slogans stylised as "LIVE IN YUR WRLD. PLY IN URS" and "U R NOT " (red E). Clow thought that by invoking such provocative statements, gamers would respond to the contrary and say Bullshit. Let me show you how ready I am. As the console's appeal enlarged, Sony's marketing efforts broadened from their earlier focus on mature players to specifically target younger children as well.

Shortly after the PlayStation's release in Europe, Sony tasked marketing manager Geoff Glendenning with assessing the desires of a new target audience. Sceptical over Nintendo and Sega's reliance on television campaigns, Glendenning theorised that young adults transitioning from fourth-generation consoles would feel neglected by marketing directed at children and teenagers. Recognising the influence early 1990s underground clubbing and rave culture had on young people, especially in the United Kingdom, Glendenning felt that the culture had become mainstream enough to help cultivate PlayStation's emerging identity. Sony partnered with prominent nightclub owners such as Ministry of Sound and festival promoters to organise dedicated PlayStation areas where demonstrations of select games could be tested. Sheffield-based graphic design studio The Designers Republic was contracted by Sony to produce promotional materials aimed at a fashionable, club-going audience. Psygnosis' Wipeout in particular became associated with nightclub culture as it was widely featured in venues. By 1997, there were 52 nightclubs in the United Kingdom with dedicated PlayStation rooms. Glendenning recalled that he had discreetly used at least £100,000 a year in slush fund money to invest in impromptu marketing.

In 1996, Sony expanded their CD production facilities in the United States due to the high demand for PlayStation games, increasing their monthly output from 4 million discs to 6.5 million discs. This was necessary because PlayStation sales were running at twice the rate of Saturn sales, and its lead dramatically increased when both consoles dropped in price to $199 that year. The PlayStation also outsold the Saturn at a similar ratio in Europe during 1996, with 2.2 million consoles sold in the region by the end of the year. Sales figures for PlayStation hardware and software only increased following the launch of the Nintendo 64. Tokunaka speculated that the Nintendo 64 launch had actually helped PlayStation sales by raising public awareness of the gaming market through Nintendo's added marketing efforts. Despite this, the PlayStation took longer to achieve dominance in Japan. Tokunaka said that, even after the PlayStation and Saturn had been on the market for nearly two years, the competition between them was still "very close", and neither console had led in sales for any meaningful length of time.

By 1998, Sega, encouraged by their declining market share and significant financial losses, launched the Dreamcast as a last-ditch attempt to stay in the industry. Although its launch was successful, the technically superior 128-bit console was unable to subdue Sony's dominance in the industry. Sony still held 60% of the overall video game market share in North America at the end of 1999. Sega's initial confidence in their new console was undermined when Japanese sales were lower than expected, with disgruntled Japanese consumers reportedly returning their Dreamcasts in exchange for PlayStation software. On 2 March 1999, Sony officially revealed details of the PlayStation 2, which Kutaragi announced would feature a graphics processor designed to push more raw polygons than any console in history, effectively rivalling most supercomputers. The PlayStation continued to sell strongly at the turn of the new millennium: in June 2000, Sony released the PSOne, a smaller, redesigned variant which went on to outsell all other consoles in that year, including the PlayStation 2. The combined successes of both PlayStation consoles led to Sega retiring the Dreamcast in 2001, and abandoning the console business entirely. The PlayStation was eventually discontinued on 23 March 2006—over eleven years after its release, and less than a year before the debut of the PlayStation 3.

Hardware

Technical specifications

The main microprocessor is a 32-bit LSI R3000 CPU with a clock rate of 33.86 MHz and 30 MIPS. Its CPU relies heavily on the "cop2" 3D and matrix math coprocessor on the same die to provide the necessary speed to render complex 3D graphics. The role of the separate GPU chip is to draw 2D polygons and apply shading and textures to them: the rasterisation stage of the graphics pipeline. Sony's custom 16-bit sound chip supports ADPCM sources with up to 24 sound channels and offers a sampling rate of up to 44.1 kHz and MIDI sequencing. It features 2 MB of main RAM, with an additional 1 MB being allocated to video memory. The PlayStation has a maximum colour depth of 16.7 million true colours with 32 levels of transparency and unlimited colour look-up tables. Its video output, initially provided by a parallel I/O cable (and later a serial I/O used for the PlayStation Link Cable) displays resolutions from 256×224 to 640×480 pixels. Different games can use different resolutions.

The PlayStation uses a proprietary video compression unit, MDEC, which is integrated into the CPU and allows for the presentation of full motion video at a higher quality than other consoles of its generation. Unusual for the time, the PlayStation lacks a dedicated 2D graphics processor; 2D elements are instead calculated as polygons by the Geometry Transfer Engine (GTE) so that they can be processed and displayed on screen by the GPU. Whilst running, the GPU can also generate a total of 4,000 sprites and 180,000 polygons per second, in addition to 360,000 per second flat-shaded.

Models

The PlayStation went through a number of variants during its production run. Externally, the most notable change was the gradual reduction in the number of external connectors from the rear of the unit. This started with the original Japanese launch units; the SCPH-1000, released on 3 December 1994, was the only model that had an S-Video port, as it was removed from the next model. Subsequent models saw a reduction in number of parallel ports, with the final version only retaining one serial port.

Sony marketed a development kit for amateur developers known as the Net Yaroze (meaning "Let's do it together" in Japanese). It was launched in June 1996 in Japan, and following public interest, was released the next year in other countries. The Net Yaroze allowed hobbyists to create their own games and upload them via an online forum run by Sony. The console was only available to buy through an ordering service and with the necessary documentation and software to program PlayStation games and applications through C programming compilers.

PS One

On 7 July 2000, Sony released the PS One (stylised as PS one), a smaller, redesigned version of the original PlayStation. It was the highest-selling console through the end of the year, outselling all other consoles—including the PlayStation 2. In 2002, Sony released a  LCD screen add-on for the PS One, referred to as the "Combo pack". It also included a car cigarette lighter adaptor adding an extra layer of portability. Production of the LCD "Combo Pack" ceased in 2004, when the popularity of the PlayStation began to wane in markets outside Japan. A total of 28.15 million PS One units had been sold by the time it was discontinued in March 2006.

Controllers

Three iterations of the PlayStation's controller were released over the console's lifespan. The first controller, the PlayStation controller, was released alongside the PlayStation in December 1994. It features four individual directional buttons (as opposed to a conventional D-pad), a pair of shoulder buttons on both sides, Start and Select buttons in the centre, and four face buttons consisting of simple geometric shapes: a green triangle, red circle, blue cross, and a pink square. Rather than depicting traditionally used letters or numbers onto its buttons, the PlayStation controller established a trademark which would be incorporated heavily into the PlayStation brand. Teiyu Goto, the designer of the original PlayStation controller, said that the circle and cross represent "yes" and "no", respectively (though this layout is reversed in Western versions); the triangle symbolises a point of view and the square is equated to a sheet of paper to be used to access menus. The European and North American models of the original PlayStation controllers are roughly 10% larger than its Japanese variant, to account for the fact the average person in those regions has larger hands than the average Japanese person.

Sony's first analogue gamepad, the PlayStation Analog Joystick (often erroneously referred to as the "Sony Flightstick"), was first released in Japan in April 1996. Featuring two parallel joysticks, it uses potentiometer technology previously used on consoles such as the Vectrex; instead of relying on binary eight-way switches, the controller detects minute angular changes through the entire range of motion. The stick also features a thumb-operated digital hat switch on the right joystick, corresponding to the traditional D-pad, and used for instances when simple digital movements were necessary. The Analog Joystick sold poorly in Japan due to its high cost and cumbersome size.

The increasing popularity of 3D games prompted Sony to add analogue sticks to its controller design to give users more freedom over their movements in virtual 3D environments. The first official analogue controller, the Dual Analog Controller, was revealed to the public in a small glass booth at the 1996 PlayStation Expo in Japan, and released in April 1997 to coincide with the Japanese releases of analogue-capable games Tobal 2 and Bushido Blade. In addition to the two analogue sticks, the Dual Analog controller features an "Analog" button and LED beneath the "Start" and "Select" buttons which toggles analogue functionality on or off. The controller also features rumble support, though Sony decided that haptic feedback would be removed from all overseas iterations before the United States release. A Sony spokesman stated that the feature was removed for "manufacturing reasons", although rumours circulated that Nintendo had attempted to legally block the release of the controller outside Japan due to similarities with the Nintendo 64 controller's Rumble Pak. However, a Nintendo spokesman denied that Nintendo took legal action. Next Generation Chris Charla theorized that Sony dropped vibration feedback to keep the price of the controller down.

In November 1997, Sony introduced the DualShock controller. Its name derives from its use of two (dual) vibration motors (shock). Unlike its predecessor, its analogue sticks feature textured rubber grips, longer handles and slightly different shoulder buttons. It also introduces two new buttons mapped to clicking in the analogue sticks and has rumble feedback included as standard on all versions. The DualShock later replaced its predecessors as the default controller.

Peripherals

Sony released a series of peripherals to add extra layers of functionality to the PlayStation. Such peripherals include memory cards, the PlayStation Mouse, the PlayStation Link Cable, the Multiplayer Adapter (a four-player multitap), the Memory Drive (a disk drive for 3.5-inch floppy disks), the GunCon (a light gun), and the Glasstron (a monoscopic head-mounted display).

Released exclusively in Japan, the PocketStation is a memory card peripheral which acts as a miniature personal digital assistant. The device features a monochrome liquid crystal display (LCD), infrared communication capability, a real-time clock, built-in flash memory, and sound capability. Sharing similarities with the Dreamcast's VMU peripheral, the PocketStation was typically distributed with certain PlayStation games, enhancing them with added features. The PocketStation proved popular in Japan, selling over five million units. Sony planned to release the peripheral outside Japan but the release was cancelled, despite receiving promotion in Europe and North America.

Functionality
In addition to playing games, most PlayStation models are equipped to play audio CDs; the Asian model SCPH-5903 can also play Video CDs. Like most CD players, the PlayStation can play songs in a programmed order, shuffle the playback order of the disc and repeat one song or the entire disc. Later PlayStation models use a music visualisation function called SoundScope. This function, as well as a memory card manager, is accessed by starting the console without either inserting a game or closing the CD tray, thereby accessing a graphical user interface (GUI) for the PlayStation BIOS. The GUI for the PS One and PlayStation differ depending on the firmware version: the original PlayStation GUI had a dark blue background with rainbow graffiti used as buttons, while the early PAL PlayStation and PS One GUI had a grey blocked background with two icons in the middle.

PlayStation emulation is versatile and can be run on numerous modern devices. Bleem! was a commercial emulator which was released for IBM-compatible PCs and the Dreamcast in 1999. It was notable for being aggressively marketed during the PlayStation's lifetime, and was the centre of multiple controversial lawsuits filed by Sony. Bleem! was programmed in assembly language, which allowed it to emulate PlayStation games with improved visual fidelity, enhanced resolutions, and filtered textures that was not possible on original hardware. Sony sued Bleem! two days after its release, citing copyright infringement and accusing the company of engaging in unfair competition and patent infringement by allowing use of PlayStation BIOSs on a Sega console. Bleem! were subsequently forced to shut down in November 2001.

Copy protection system 
Sony was aware that using CDs for game distribution could have left games vulnerable to piracy, due to the growing popularity of CD-R and optical disc drives with burning capability. To preclude illegal copying, a proprietary process for PlayStation disc manufacturing was developed that, in conjunction with an augmented optical drive in Tiger H/E assembly, prevented burned copies of games from booting on an unmodified console. Specifically, all genuine PlayStation discs were printed with a small section of deliberate irregular data, which the PlayStation's optical pick-up was capable of detecting and decoding. Consoles would not boot game discs without a specific wobble frequency contained in the data of the disc pregap sector (the same system was also used to encode discs' regional lock-outs). This signal was within Red Book CD tolerances, so PlayStation discs' actual content could still be read by a conventional disc drive; however, the disc drive could not detect the wobble frequency (therefore duplicating the discs omitting it), since the laser pickup system of any optical disc drive would interpret this wobble as an oscillation of the disc surface and compensate for it in the reading process.

As the disc authenticity was only verified during booting, this copy protection system could be circumvented by swapping any genuine disc with the copied disc, while modchips could remove the protection system altogether. Sony untruthfully suggested in advertisements that discs' unique black undersides played a role in copy protection. In reality, the black plastic used was transparent to any infrared laser and did not itself pose an obstacle to duplicators or computer CD drives, although it may have helped customers distinguish between unofficial and genuine copies.

Hardware problems
Early PlayStations, particularly early 1000 models, experience skipping full-motion video or physical "ticking" noises from the unit. The problems stem from poorly placed vents leading to overheating in some environments, causing the plastic mouldings inside the console to warp slightly and create knock-on effects with the laser assembly. The solution is to sit the console on a surface which dissipates heat efficiently in a well vented area or raise the unit up slightly from its resting surface. Sony representatives also recommended unplugging the PlayStation when it is not in use, as the system draws in a small amount of power (and therefore heat) even when turned off.

The first batch of PlayStations use a KSM-440AAM laser unit, whose case and movable parts are all built out of plastic. Over time, the plastic lens sled rail wears out—usually unevenly—due to friction. The placement of the laser unit close to the power supply accelerates wear, due to the additional heat, which makes the plastic more vulnerable to friction. Eventually, one side of the lens sled will become so worn that the laser can tilt, no longer pointing directly at the CD; after this, games will no longer load due to data read errors. Sony fixed the problem by making the sled out of die-cast metal and placing the laser unit further away from the power supply on later PlayStation models.

Due to an engineering oversight, the PlayStation does not produce a proper signal on several older models of televisions, causing the display to flicker or bounce around the screen. Sony decided not to change the console design, since only a small percentage of PlayStation owners used such televisions, and instead gave consumers the option of sending their PlayStation unit to a Sony service centre to have an official modchip installed, allowing play on older televisions.

Game library

A total of 3,061 PlayStation games have been released worldwide; The PlayStation's bestselling game is Gran Turismo (1997), which sold 10.85 million units. After the PlayStation's discontinuation in 2006, the cumulative software shipment was 962 million units.

The PlayStation featured a diverse game library which grew to appeal to all types of players. The first two games available at launch were Jumping Flash! (1995) and Ridge Racer, with Jumping Flash! heralded as an ancestor for 3D graphics in console gaming. Critically acclaimed PlayStation games included Final Fantasy VII (1997), Crash Bandicoot (1996), Spyro the Dragon (1998), Metal Gear Solid (1998), all of which became established franchises. Final Fantasy VII is credited with allowing role-playing games to gain mass-market appeal outside Japan, and is considered one of the most influential and greatest video games ever made.

At the time of the PlayStation's first Christmas season, Psygnosis had produced around 70% of its launch catalogue; its breakthrough racing game Wipeout was acclaimed for its techno soundtrack and helped raise awareness of Britain's underground music community. Eidos Interactive's action-adventure game Tomb Raider contributed substantially to the success of the console in 1996, with its main protagonist Lara Croft becoming an early gaming icon and garnering unprecedented media promotion. Licensed tie-in video games of popular films were also prevalent; Argonaut Games' 2001 adaptation of Harry Potter and the Philosopher's Stone went on to sell over eight million copies late in the console's lifespan. Third-party developers committed largely to the console's wide-ranging game catalogue even after the launch of the PlayStation 2.

Initially, in the United States, PlayStation games were packaged in long cardboard boxes, similar to non-Japanese 3DO and Saturn games. Sony later switched to the jewel case format typically used for audio CDs and Japanese video games, as this format took up less retailer shelf space (which was at a premium due to the large number of PlayStation games being released), and focus testing showed that most consumers preferred this format.

Reception
The PlayStation was mostly well received upon release. Critics in the west generally welcomed the new console; the staff of Next Generation reviewed the PlayStation a few weeks after its North American launch, where they commented that, while the CPU is "fairly average", the supplementary custom hardware, such as the GPU and sound processor, is stunningly powerful. They praised the PlayStation's focus on 3D, and complemented the comfort of its controller and the convenience of its memory cards. Giving the system 4 out of 5 stars, they concluded, "To succeed in this extremely cut-throat market, you need a combination of great hardware, great games, and great marketing. Whether by skill, luck, or just deep pockets, Sony has scored three out of three in the first salvo of this war". Albert Kim from Entertainment Weekly praised the PlayStation as a technological marvel, rivalling that of Sega and Nintendo. Famicom Tsūshin scored the console a 19 out of 40, lower than the Saturn's 24 out of 40, in May 1995.

In a 1997 year-end review, a team of five Electronic Gaming Monthly editors gave the PlayStation scores of 9.5, 8.5, 9.0, 9.0, and 9.5—for all five editors, the highest score they gave to any of the five consoles reviewed in the issue. They lauded the breadth and quality of the games library, saying it had vastly improved over previous years due to developers mastering the system's capabilities in addition to Sony revising its stance on 2D and role playing games. They also complimented the low price point of the games compared to the Nintendo 64's, and noted that it was the only console on the market that could be relied upon to deliver a solid stream of games for the coming year, primarily due to third party developers almost unanimously favouring it over its competitors.

Legacy
SCE was an upstart in the video game industry in late 1994, as the video game market in the early 1990s was dominated by Nintendo and Sega. Nintendo had been the clear leader in the industry since the introduction of the Nintendo Entertainment System in 1985 and the Nintendo 64 was initially expected to maintain this position. The PlayStation's target audience included the generation which was the first to grow up with mainstream video games, along with 18- to 29-year-olds who were not the primary focus of Nintendo. By the late 1990s, Sony became a highly regarded console brand due to the PlayStation, with a significant lead over second-place Nintendo, while Sega was relegated to a distant third.

The PlayStation became the first "computer entertainment platform" to ship over 100 million units worldwide, with many critics attributing the console's success to third-party developers. Around 7,900 individual games were published for the console during its 11-year life span, the second-most games ever produced for a console. Its success resulted in a significant financial boon for Sony as profits from its video game division contributed to 23%.

Sony's next-generation PlayStation 2, which is backward compatible with the PlayStation's DualShock controller and games, was announced in 1999 and launched in 2000. The PlayStation's lead in installed base and developer support paved the way for the success of its successor, which overcame the earlier launch of the Sega's Dreamcast and then fended off competition from Microsoft's newcomer Xbox and Nintendo's GameCube. The PlayStation 2's immense success and failure of the Dreamcast were among the main factors which led to Sega abandoning the console market. To date, five PlayStation home consoles have been released, which have continued the same numbering scheme, as well as two portable systems. Hundreds of PlayStation games were re-released as PS One Classics for purchase and download on the PlayStation Portable, PlayStation 3, and PlayStation Vita. The PlayStation 2 and PlayStation 3 also maintained backward compatibility with original PlayStation discs.

The PlayStation has often ranked among the best video game consoles. In 2018, Retro Gamer named it the third best console, crediting its sophisticated 3D capabilities as one of its key factors in gaining mass success, and lauding it as a "game-changer in every sense possible". In 2009, IGN ranked the PlayStation the seventh best console in their list, noting its appeal towards older audiences to be a crucial factor in propelling the video game industry, as well as its assistance in transitioning game industry to use the CD-ROM format. Keith Stuart from The Guardian likewise named it as the seventh best console in 2020, declaring that its success was so profound it "ruled the 1990s".

CD format
The success of the PlayStation contributed to the demise of cartridge-based home consoles. While not the first system to use an optical disc format, it was the first highly successful one, and ended up going head-to-head with the proprietary cartridge-relying Nintendo 64. After the demise of the Sega Saturn, Nintendo was left as Sony's main competitor in Western markets. Nintendo chose not to use CDs for the Nintendo 64; it was likely concerned with the proprietary cartridge format's ability to help enforce copy protection, given its substantial reliance on licensing and exclusive games for its revenue.

Besides their larger capacity, CD-ROMs could be produced in bulk quantities at a much faster rate than ROM cartridges, a week compared to two to three months. Further, the cost of production per unit was far cheaper, allowing Sony to offer games about 40% lower cost to the user compared to ROM cartridges while still making the same amount of net revenue. In Japan, Sony published fewer copies of a wide variety of games for the PlayStation as a risk-limiting step, a model that had been used by Sony Music for CD audio discs. The production flexibility of CD-ROMs meant that Sony could produce larger volumes of popular games to get onto the market quickly, something that could not be done with cartridges due to their manufacturing lead time. The lower production costs of CD-ROMs also allowed publishers an additional source of profit: budget-priced reissues of games which had already recouped their development costs.

Tokunaka remarked in 1996: 

The increasing complexity of developing games pushed cartridges to their storage limits and gradually discouraged some third-party developers. Part of the CD format's appeal to publishers was that they could be produced at a significantly lower cost and offered more production flexibility to meet demand. As a result, some third-party developers switched to the PlayStation, including Square, whose Final Fantasy VII, and Enix (later merged with Square to form Square Enix), whose Dragon Quest VII (2000) were planned for the Nintendo 64. Other developers released fewer games for the Nintendo 64 (Konami, releasing only thirteen N64 games but over fifty on the PlayStation). Nintendo 64 game releases were less frequent than the PlayStation's, with many being developed by either Nintendo itself or second-parties such as Rare.

PlayStation Classic

The PlayStation Classic is a dedicated video game console made by Sony Interactive Entertainment that emulates PlayStation games. It was announced in September 2018 at the Tokyo Game Show, and released on 3 December 2018, the 24th anniversary of the release of the original.

As a dedicated console, the PlayStation Classic features 20 pre-installed games, such as Tekken 3 (1996), Final Fantasy VII, Jumping Flash!,  and Syphon Filter (1999); the games run off the open source emulator PCSX. The console is bundled with two replica wired PlayStation controllers (those without analogue sticks), an HDMI cable, and a USB-Type A cable. Internally, the console uses a MediaTek MT8167a Quad A35 system on a chip with four central processing cores clocked at @ 1.5 GHz and a Power VR GE8300 graphics processing unit. It includes 16 GB of eMMC flash storage and 1 GB of DDR3 SDRAM. The PlayStation Classic is 45% smaller than the original console.

The PlayStation Classic received negative reviews from critics and was compared unfavorably to Nintendo's rival NES Classic Edition and Super NES Classic Edition. Criticism was directed at its meager game library, user interface, emulation quality, use of PAL versions for certain games, use of the original controller, and high retail price, though the console's design received praise. It sold poorly as a result.

See also
 PlayStation: The Official Magazine (PSM)
 Portable Sound Format (PSF)
 System 573

Notes

References

Citations

Publications

 
1990s toys
2000s toys
CD-ROM-based consoles
Discontinued video game consoles
Fifth-generation video game consoles
Home video game consoles
Japanese brands
PlayStation (brand)
Products introduced in 1994
Products and services discontinued in 2006
Sony consoles